"For Once in My Life" is a song written by Ron Miller and most famously performed by Stevie Wonder.

For Once in My Life may also refer to:

 For Once in My Life (Stevie Wonder album), 1968
 For Once in My Life (Carmen McRae album), 1967
 For Once in My Life (Sylvia Syms album), 1967
 For Once in My Life (Tony Bennett album), 1967
 For Once in My Life, a 1969 live album by Vikki Carr
 For Once in My Life, a 1971 album by Nancy Wilson
 "For Once in My Life" (Mel B song), 2013

See also 
 Once in a Lifetime (disambiguation)